Tocharian and Indo-European Studies (TIES) is a scholarly journal on Tocharian in the Indo-European context, established in 1987 by the Icelandic linguist Jörundur Garðar Hilmarsson. The journal initially appeared in Reykjavík, Iceland, but after Hilmarsson's death in 1992, the Danish linguist Jens Elmegård Rasmussen became the new executive editor, and the journal is currently based at Museum Tusculanum Press in Copenhagen. Until 2008 it was based at C.A. Reitzel Publishers Ltd., also in Copenhagen. When Rasmussen died in 2013, Birgit Anette Olsen became the new executive editor.

Editors 
Birgit Anette Olsen (Copenhagen, executive editor, 2013-), Georges-Jean Pinault (Paris), Klaus T. Schmidt (Saarbrücken), Michaël Peyrot (Leiden, 2009-), Thomas Olander (Copenhagen, assistant editor 2009-).
Jörundur Garðar Hilmarsson (Reykjavík, died 1992, founder and former editor-in-chief), Jens Elmegård Rasmussen (Copenhagen, executive editor, 1992-2013), Werner Winter (Preetz, died 2010), Guðrún Þórhallsdóttir (1992-1993 and supervision of the supplementary series 1992-1997), Lambert Isebaert (Louvain/Namur, assistant editor until 2000)

Editorial advisory board (1987-2003) 
Douglas Q. Adams (Moscow, Idaho)
Hreinn Benediktsson (Reykjavík)
Ronald E. Emmerick (Hamburg)
Jay Jasanoff (Harvard) (from 1999)
Xian-lin Ji (Ji Xianlin) (until 1997)
Frederik Kortlandt (Leiden)
Fredrik O. Lindeman (Oslo)
H. Craig Melchert (UCLA)
Donald A. Ringe, Jr. (Philadelphia)
Guðrún Þórhallsdóttir (Reykjavík)

External links 
 Tocharian and Indo-European Studies on the publisher's website

Linguistics journals
Indo-European linguistics works
Tocharian languages